The Elfin 622 is an Australian Formula 2 racing car produced from 1972-1974 by Elfin Sports Cars. Elfin also produced a version of this car optimised for Australian Formula 3 called the Elfin 623.

References

622
Cars of Australia
Formula Two cars
Formula Three cars